{{DISPLAYTITLE:P2-irreducible manifold}}
In mathematics, a P2-irreducible manifold is a 3-manifold that is irreducible and contains no 2-sided  (real projective plane). An orientable manifold is P2-irreducible if and only if it is irreducible. Every non-orientable P2-irreducible manifold is a Haken manifold.

References

3-manifolds